Following is a list of Acorn Electron games, with original publishers.

 

0–9
3D Bomb Alley (Software Invasion)
3D Dotty (Blue Ribbon)
3D Maze (IJK)
3D Tankzone (Dynabyte)
737 Flight Simulator (Salamander)
747 (Doctorsoft)
747 Flight Simulator (DACC Limited)
767 Advanced Flight Simulator (Flightdeck)

A
Abyss (Cases)
Aces High (Oasis)
Acheton (Topologika)
Adventure (Micro Power)
Adventureland (Adventure International)
The Adventures of Buckaroo Banzai (Adventure International)
Adventurous English (Highlight)
Airline (Cases)
Alien Break In (Romik)
Alien Dropout (Superior Software)
Alphatron (Tynesoft)
Anarchy Zone (Atlantis)
Arcade Soccer (4th Dimension)
Arcadians (Acornsoft)
Arena 3000 (Microdeal)
Arrow of Death part 1 (Adventure Soft)
Arrow of Death part 2 (Adventure Soft)
Astro Plumber (Blue Ribbon)
Atom Smasher (Romik)
Auf Wiedersehen, Pet (Tynesoft)
Avon (Topologika)

B
Ballistix (Superior Software/Acornsoft)
Balloon Buster (Blue Ribbon)
Bandits at 3 O'Clock (Micro Power)
Bar Billiards (Blue Ribbon)
Barbarian: The Ultimate Warrior (Superior Software/Acornsoft)
Barbarian II: The Dungeon of Drax (Superior Software/Acornsoft)
Baron (Superior Software/Acornsoft)
Battle 1917 (Cases)
Battlefields (BBCSoft)
Battlezone 2000 (MC Lothlorien)
Battlezone Six (Kansas)
Beach-Head (U.S. Gold)
Bed Bugs (Optima Software)
Beebtreck (Software For All)
The Big KO (Tynesoft)
Birdie Barrage (CDS Software)
Birds of Prey (Romik)
Birdstrike (Firebird)
Blagger (Alligata)
Blast! (Audiogenic)
Blitzkrieg (Software Invasion)
Blockbusters (Macsen)
Blockbusters Gold Run (Macsen)
Blockbusters Question Master (Macsen)
Bobby Charlton Soccer (DACC Limited)
Boffin (Addictive Games)
Bomber Baron (Optyx)
Bonecruncher (Superior Software/Acornsoft)
The Boss (Peaksoft)
Boulder Dash (Tynesoft)
Bouncing Bombs (Tynesoft)
Boxer (Acornsoft)
Bozo the Brave (Tynesoft)
Braz (Livewire)
Breakthrough (Audiogenic)
Brian Clough's Football Fortunes (CDS Software)
Brian Jacks Superstar Challenge (Martech)
Bridge Challenge (Livewire)
Bridge Master (J Keyne)
Bruce's Play Your Cards Right (Britannia)
Buffalo Bill's Rodeo Games (Tynesoft)
Bug Blaster (Alligata)
Bug Eyes (Icon)
Bug Eyes 2 (Audiogenic)
Bugs (Virgin Games)
Bullseye (Macsen)
Bumble Bee (Micro Power)
Bun Fun (Squirrel)
Business Games (Acornsoft)
By Fair Means or Foul (Superior Software/Acornsoft)

C
Camelot (Superior Software/Blue Ribbon)
Castle Assault (Blue Ribbon)
Castle Blackstar (SCR Adventures)
Castle of Riddles (Acornsoft)
Castles & Clowns (Macmillan)
Caterpillar (IJK)
Caterpillar (Romik)
Caveman (Kansas)
Caveman Capers (Icon)
Centibug (Superior Software)
Chess (Acornsoft)
Chess (Micro Power)
Chess (Superior Software)
Chip Buster (Software Invasion)
Chuckie Egg (A&F Software)
Circus (Adventure Soft)
Circus Games (Tynesoft)
Citadel (Superior Software)
City Defence (Bug-Byte)
Clogger (Impact Software)
Codename: Droid (Superior Software/Acornsoft)
Colossus Bridge 4 (CDS Software)
Colossus Chess 4 (CDS Software)
Combat Lynx (Durell Software)
Commando (Elite)
Commonwealth Games (Tynesoft)
Condition Red (Blue Ribbon)
Confuzion (Incentive)
Contact Bridge (Alligata)
Cops 'n' Robbers (Atlantis)
Corn Cropper (Cases)
Corporate Climber (Dynabyte)
Cosmic Camouflage (Superior Software/Acornsoft)
The Count (Adventure International)
Countdown to Doom (Topologika)
Counter Attack (OIC)
Crack-Up (Atlantis)
Crazee Rider (Superior Software/Acornsoft)
Crazy Er*Bert (Alternative Software)
Crazy Tracer (Acornsoft)
Creepy Cave (Atlantis)
Cricket (Bug-Byte)
Croaker (Micro Power)
Crown Jewels (Alligata)
Crystal Castles (U.S. Gold)
Custard Pie Fight (Comsoft)
Cybertron Mission (Micro Power)
Cyborg Warriors (Superior Software/Acornsoft)
Cylon Attack (A&F Software)
Cylon Invasion (Tynesoft)

D
Dallas (Cases)
Danger UXB (Micro Power)
Daredevil Dennis (Visions)
Darts (Blue Ribbon)
Dead or Alive (Alternative Software)
Deathstar (Superior Software)
Despatch Rider (Audiogenic)
Diamond Mine (MRM)
Diamond Mine II (Blue Ribbon)
Diamond Pete (Alligata)
Dogfight - For Aces Only (Slogger Systems)
Dominoes (Blue Ribbon)
Drain Mania (Icon)
Draughts (Superior Software)
Draughts & Reversi (Acornsoft)
Dream Time (Heyley)
Dunjunz (Bug-Byte)

E
E-Type (4th Dimension)
Eddie Kidd Jump Challenge (Martech)
Egghead In Space (Cronosoft)
Electron Invaders (Micro Power)
Elite (Acornsoft)
Elixir (Superior Software/Acornsoft)
Empire (Shards Software)
Enigma (Brainbox)
Enthar Seven (Robico)
Er*Bert (Microbyte)
Escape from Moonbase Alpha (Micro Power)
Escape from Pulsar 7 (Adventure Soft)
Evening Star (Hewson Consultants)
Exile (Superior Software/Acornsoft)

F
Fantasia Diamond (Hewson Consultants)
The Feasibility Experiment (Adventure Soft)
Felix and the Fruit Monsters (Micro Power)
Felix in the Factory (Micro Power)
Felix Meets the Evil Weevils (Micro Power)
Fighter Pilot (Kansas)
Firebug (Acornsoft)
Firetrack (Superior Software/Acornsoft)
Firienwood (MP Software)
First Moves Chess (Longman)
Five-A-Side Socca (IJK)
Flight Path 737 (Anirog)
Football Manager (Addictive Games)
Footballer of the Year (Gremlin)
Frak! (Aardvark)
Frankenstein 2000 (Icon)
Free Fall (Acornsoft)
Frenzy (Micro Power)
Froot Raid (Audiogenic)
Fruit Catcher (Livewire)
Fruit Machine (Alligata)
Fruit Machine (Superior Software)
Fruit Machine (Doctorsoft)
Fruit Machine Simulator (Codemasters)
Fun School 1 (Database Educational Software)
Fun School 2 (Database Educational Software)
Future Shock (Tynesoft)

G
Galactic Commander (Micro Power)
Galactic Patrol (Mastertronic)
Galaforce (Superior Software)
Galaforce 2 (Superior Software/Blue Ribbon)
Galaxy Wars (Bug-Byte)
Gatecrasher (Quicksilva)
Gauntlet (Micro Power)
Geoff Capes Strong Man (Martech)
Ghost Town (Adventure International)
Ghouls (Micro Power)
Gisburne's Castle (Martech)
Go (Acornsoft)
Goal! (Tynesoft)
The Golden Baton (Adventure Soft)
The Golden Figurine (Atlantis)
The Golden Voyage (Adventure International)
Golf (Blue Ribbon)
Golf (Yes!)
Gorph (Doctorsoft)
Graham Gooch's Match Cricket (Alternative Software)
Graham Gooch's Test Cricket (Audiogenic)
The Great Wall (Artic Computing)
Gremlins: The Adventure (Adventure Soft)
Grid Iron (Top Ten)
Grid Iron 2 (Alternative Software)
Guardian (Alligata)
Gunfighter (Atlantis)
Gunsmoke (Software Invasion)
Gyroscope (Melbourne House)

H
The Hacker (Firebird)
Hampstead (Melbourne House)
Hard Hat Harry (Retro Software)
Hareraiser (Haresoft)
Harlequin (Kansas)
Heathrow ATC (Hewson Consultants)
Hell Hole (Alligata)
Helter Skelter (Audiogenic)
Hercules (The Power House)
Hezarin (Topologika)
Hi Q Quiz (Blue Ribbon)
Hobgoblin (Atlantis)
Hobgoblin 2 (Atlantis)
Holed Out (4th Dimension)
Holed Out Extra Courses 1 (4th Dimension)
Holed Out Extra Courses 2 (4th Dimension)
Hopper (Acornsoft)
Horoscopes (Third Program)
Horse Race (Dynabyte)
Hostages (Superior Software/Acornsoft)
House of Horrors (Kayess)
Hunchback (Ocean)
Hunkidory (Bug-Byte)
Hyper Viper (Retro Software)
Hyperball (Superior Software/Acornsoft)
Hyperdrive (IJK)

I
Ian Botham's Test Match (Tynesoft)
Icarus (Mandarin)
Ice Hockey (Bug-Byte)
Imogen (Superior Software/Acornsoft)
Impact (Audiogenic)
Impossible Mission (U.S. Gold)
Indoor Soccer (Alternative Software)
Indoor Sports (Tynesoft)
Inertia (4th Dimension)
Intergalactic Trader (Micro Power)
Inu (MRJ)
Invaders (IJK)
Invaders (Superior Software)

J
Jack Attack (Bug-Byte)
Jet-Boot Jack (English Software)
Jet Power Jack (Micro Power)
Jet Set Willy (Tynesoft)
Jet Set Willy II (Tynesoft)
Joe Blade (Players)
Joe Blade 2 (Players)
Joey (Blue Ribbon)
Johnny Reb (MC Lothlorien)
Jump Jet (Anirog)
Jungle Jive (Virgin Games)
Jungle Journey (Retro Software)
Junior Maths Pack (Micro Power)

K
Kamakazi (A&F Software)
Kane (Mastertronic)
Karate Combat (Superior Software)
Kastle (Tynesoft)
Kayleth (U.S. Gold)
Ket Trilogy (Incentive)
Killapede (Players)
Killer Gorilla (Micro Power)
Killer Gorilla 2 (Superior Software/Acornsoft)
Kingdom of Hamil (Topologika)
Kissin' Kousins (English Software)
Know Your Own Psi-Q (Mirrorsoft)
Kourtyard (Go-Dax)

L
Laser Reflex (Talent Computer Systems)
The Last Days of Doom|Last Days of Doom (Topologika)
Last Ninja (Superior Software/Acornsoft)
Last Ninja 2 (Superior Software/Acornsoft)
Last of the Free (Audiogenic)
League Challenge (Atlantis)
Lemming Syndrome (Dynabyte)
Licence to Kill (Alternative Software)
The Life of Repton (Superior Software/Acornsoft)
The Living Body (Martech)
Locomotion (BBCSoft)
Loony Loco (Kansas)
Loopz (Audiogenic)
Lunar Rescue (Alligata)

M
Magic Mushrooms (Acornsoft)
Mango (Blue Ribbon)
Maniac Mower (Kansas)
Master Break (Superior Software/Acornsoft)
Maze (Acornsoft)
Mazezam (Retro Software)
Megaforce (Tynesoft)
Mendips Stone (Dee-Kay)
Merry Xmas Santa (Icon)
Meteors (Acornsoft)
Mexico '86 (Qualsoft)
Micro Olympics (Database Software)
Microball (Alternative Software)
Mikie (Imagine)
Millionaire (Incentive)
The Mine (Micro Power)
Mined Out (Quicksilva)
Mineshaft (Durell Software)
Missile Control (Gemini)
Monkey Nuts (Bug-Byte)
Monsters (Acornsoft)
Moon Buggy (Kansas)
Moon Raider (Micro Power)
Mouse Trap (Tynesoft)
Mr Wiz (Superior Software)
Munchman (Kansas)
Murdac (Topologika)
Mystery Fun House (Adventure International)

N
Network (Superior Software/Acornsoft)
Night Strike (Alternative Software)
Night World (Alligata)
Nightmare Maze (Blue Ribbon)

O
Omega Orb (Audiogenic)
Omega Probe (Optima Software)
One Last Game (Bevan Technology)
Orbital (Impact Software)
Osprey (Bourne)
Overdrive (Superior Software)
Oxbridge (Tynesoft)

P
Palace of Magic (Superior Software/Acornsoft)
Pandemonium (Superior Software/Acornsoft)
Panik! (Atlantis)
Paperboy (Elite)
Paras (MC Lothlorien)
Paul Daniels Magic Show (Acornsoft)
Pedro (Imagine)
Peg Leg (IJK)
Pengi (Visions)
Pengywn (Postern)
Percy Penguin (Superior Software)
Perplexity (Superior Software/Acornsoft)
Perseus and Andromeda (Adventure Soft)
Pettigrew's Diary (Shards Software)
Phantom (Tynesoft)
Phantom Combat (Doctorsoft)
Pharaoh's Tomb (A&F Software)
Philosopher's Quest (Acornsoft)
Pinball (Microbyte)
Pinball Arcade (Kansas)
Pipe Mania (Empire Interactive)
Pipeline (Superior Software/Acornsoft)
Pirate Adventure (Adventure International)
Plan B (Bug-Byte)
Plan B2 (Bug-Byte)
Planetoid (Acornsoft)
Playbox (Comsoft)
Plunder (Cases)
Podd (ASK/Acornsoft)
Poker (Duckworth)
Pool (Dynabyte)
Positron (Micro Power)
Predator (Superior Software/Acornsoft)
Pro Boxing Simulator (Codemasters)
Pro Golf (Atlantis)
Psycastria (Audiogenic)
Psycastria 2 (Audiogenic)
Pyramid of Doom (Adventure International)

Q
Qbix (Alligata)
Quest (Superior Software/Acornsoft)
Quest for Freedom (IJK)
A Question of Sport (Superior Software/Acornsoft)
Questprobe featuring The Human Torch and The Thing (Adventure International)
Questprobe: The Incredible Hulk (Adventure International)
Questprobe: Spiderman (Adventure International)
Qwak (Superior Software/Acornsoft)

R
Ransack (Audiogenic)
Ravage (Blue Ribbon)
Ravenskull (Superior Software)
Rebel Planet (U.S. Gold)
Red Coats (MC Lothlorien)
Repton (Superior Software)
Repton 2 (Superior Software)
Repton 3 (Superior Software/Acornsoft)
Repton Around the World (Superior Software/Acornsoft)
Repton Infinity (Superior Software/Acornsoft)
Repton: The Lost Realms (Retro Software)
Repton Thru Time (Superior Software/Acornsoft)
Return of R2 (Blue Ribbon)
Return to Doom (Topologika)
Revenge of Zor (Kansas)
Reversi (Microbyte)
Reversi (Kansas)
Reversi (Superior Software)
Ricochet (Superior Software/Acornsoft)
Rig Attack (Tynesoft)
Rik the Roadie (Alternative Software)
Robin of Sherwood (Adventure Soft)
Roboto (Bug-Byte)
Robotron: 2084 (Atarisoft)
Roman Empire (MC Lothlorien)
Round Ones (Alternative Software)
Row of Four (Software For All)
RTC Birmingham (Dee-Kay)
RTC Crewe (Dee-Kay)
RTC Doncaster (Dee-Kay)
Rubble Trouble (Micro Power)

S
Saigon (Tynesoft)
Santa's Delivery (Tynesoft)
Saracoid (Audiogenic)
SAS Commander (Comsoft)
Savage Island part 1 (Adventure International)
Savage Island part 2 (Adventure International)
Savage Pond (Starcade)
Screwball (Blue Ribbon)
Sea Wolf (Optima Software)
Secret Mission (Adventure International)
Serpent's Lair (Comsoft)
Shanghai Warriors (Players)
Shark (Audiogenic)
Shark Attack (Romik)
Shedmaster Bounds Green (Dee-Kay)
Shedmaster Finsbury Park]] (Dee-Kay)
Shuffle (Budgie)
Sim (CSM / Viper)
SimCity (Superior Software/Acornsoft)
Skirmish (Go-Dax)
Sky Hawk (Bug-Byte)
Smash and Grab (Superior Software)
Snake (Kansas)
Snapper (Acornsoft)
Snapple Hopper (Macmillan)
Snooker (Acornsoft)
Snooker (Visions)
Soccer Boss (Alternative Software)
Soccer Supremo (Qualsoft)
Sooty's Fun With Numbers (Friendly Learning)
Sorcerer of Claymorgue Castle (Adventure International)
South Devon Hyrdraulics (Dee-Kay)
Southern Belle (Hewson Consultants)
Space Agent Zelda (Audiogenic)
Space Caverns (Tynesoft)
Space Ranger (Audiogenic)
Space Shuttle (Microdeal)
Space Station Alpha (Icon)
Space Trek (Dimax)
Spaceman Sid (English Software)
Special Operations (MC Lothlorien)
Spectipede (Mastertronic)
Spellbinder (Superior Software/Acornsoft)
Sphere of Destiny (Audiogenic)
Sphere of Destiny 2 (Audiogenic)
Sphinx Adventure (Acornsoft)
Spitfire 40 (Mirrorsoft)
Spooksville (Blue Ribbon)
Sporting Triangles (CDS Software)
Spy Snatcher (Topologika)
Spy vs. Spy (Tynesoft)
Spycat (Superior Software/Acornsoft)
Squeekaliser (Bug-Byte)
Stairway to Hell (Software Invasion)
Star Drifter (Firebird)
Star Force Seven (Bug-Byte)
Star Maze 2 (Mastertronic)
Star Wars (Domark)
Starport (Superior Software/Acornsoft)
Starship Command (Acornsoft)
Steve Davis Snooker (CDS Software)
Stix (Supersoft)
Stock Car (Micro Power)
The Stolen Lamp (MC Lothlorien)
Storm Cycle (Atlantis)
Stranded (Superior Software)
Strange Odyssey (Adventure International)
Stratobomber (IJK)
Strike Force Harrier (Mirrorsoft)
Strip Poker II Plus (Anco Software)
Stryker's Run (Superior Software/Acornsoft)
Subway Vigilante (Players)
Summer Olympiad (Tynesoft)
Super Hangman (IJK)
Super Fruit (Simonsoft)
Super Golf (Squirrel)
Super Gran: The Adventure (Tynesoft)
Super Pool (Software Invasion)
Superior Soccer (Superior Software/Acornsoft)
Superman: The Game (First Star/Prism Leisure)
Superman: The Man of Steel (Tynesoft)
Survivors (Atlantis)
Swag (Micro Power)
Swoop (Micro Power)
Syncron (Superior Software)

T
Tactic (Superior Software - Unreleased)
Tales of the Arabian Nights (Interceptor Micros)
Tank Attack (CDS Software)
The Taroda Scheme (Heyley)
Tarzan (Martech)
Tarzan Boy (Alligata)
Tempest (Superior Software)
Templeton (Bug-Byte)
Ten Little Indians (Adventure Soft)
Tennis (Bug-Byte)
Terrormolinos (Melbourne House)
Test Match (CRL)
Tetris (Mirrorsoft)
Thai Boxing (Anco Software)
Thrust (Superior Software)
Thunderstruck (Audiogenic)
Thunderstruck 2 (Audiogenic)
The Time Machine (Adventure Soft)
The Times Computer Crosswords Jubilee Puzzles (The Times)
The Times Computer Crosswords Volume 1 (The Times)
Tomcat (Players)
Tops and Tails (Macmillan)
Traditional Games (Gemini)
Trafalgar (Squirrel)
Trapper (Blue Ribbon)
Treasure Hunt (Macsen)
Trek II (Tynesoft)
Twin Kingdom Valley (Bug-Byte)

U
Uggie's Garden (Superior Software - Unreleased)
UKPM (IJK)
Ultron (Icon)
Uranians (Bug-Byte)
US Drag Racing (Tynesoft)

V
Vegas Jackpot (Mastertronic)
Vertigo (Superior Software/Acornsoft)
Video Card Arcade (Blue Ribbon)
Video Classics (Firebird)
Video Pinball (Alternative Software)
Video's Revenge (Budgie)
Vindaloo (Tynesoft)
Voodoo Castle (Adventure International)
Vortex (Software Invasion)

W
Walk the Plank (Mastertronic)
War at Sea (Betasoft)
Warehouse (Top Ten)
Warp 1 (Icon)
Waterloo (MC Lothlorien)
Waxworks (Adventure Soft)
The Way of the Exploding Fist (Melbourne House)
Web War (Artic Computing)
Weenies (Cronosoft)
Weetabix vs the Titchies (Romik)
West  (Talent Computer Systems)
Wet Zone (Tynesoft)
Whist Challenge (Livewire)
White Knight Mk 11 (BBCSoft)
White Magic (4th Dimension)
White Magic 2 (4th Dimension)
Whoopsy (Shards Software)
Winter Olympiad '88 (Tynesoft)
Winter Olympic (Tynesoft)
The Wizard of Akyrz (Adventure Soft)
Wizzy's Mansion (Audiogenic)
Woks (Artic Computing)
Wongo (Icon)

X
Xadomy (Brassington)
Xanagrams (Postern)
XOR (Logotron)

Y
Yie Ar Kung-Fu (Imagine)
Yie Ar Kung-Fu II (Imagine)

Z
Zalaga (Aardvark)
Zany Kong Junior (Superior Software)
Zenon (Impact Software)
Ziggy (Audiogenic)
Zorakk the Conqueror (Icon)

See also
Lists of video games

Acorn Electron